Fangs of the Wild may refer to:

Fangs of the Wild (1928 film), an American film directed by Jerome Storm
Fangs of the Wild (1939 film), an American film directed by Bernard B. Ray
Fangs of the Wild (1954 film), an American film directed by William F. Claxton